The Men's Pan American Cup is a men's international field hockey competition organised by the Pan American Hockey Federation. The winning team becomes the champion of the Americas and qualifies for the FIH Hockey World Cup.

Argentina has won the tournament four times. Canada and Cuba have both won the tournament once.

The hosts together with six highest-ranked teams from the previous edition are qualified directly for the tournament, they are joined by the top team from the Men's Pan American Challenge or the top two teams if the host is already qualified.

Results

Summary

* = hosts

Team appearances

See also
Field hockey at the Pan American Games
Men's Indoor Pan American Cup
Men's Pan American Challenge
Men's Pan American Junior Championship
Women's Pan American Cup

References

External links
Pan American Cup on PAHF

 
Pan American Cup
Pan American Cup
Field hockey